John Perkins (born ) is a former  international rugby union player. 

Perkins made his debut for Wales on 19 February 1983 versus Scotland. He played club rugby for Pontypool RFC.

References 

1954 births
Living people
Blaenavon RFC players
Rugby union players from Blaenavon
Pontypool RFC players
Wales international rugby union players
Welsh rugby union players
20th-century Welsh people